Washout (John Lopez) is a fictional mutant character appearing in American comic books published by Marvel Comics. The character first appeared in a one-page cameo in X-Force vol. 1 #129 before being given a larger role in the Weapon X series.

Fictional character biography
Young John was a chronic child bed-wetter, until he discovered that he had the mutant ability to generate a spurt of water from his body on touch. Having no friends and no family, John wanted to try his luck at an audition to join the new media-savvy X-Force team. Taking on the codename Washout, John competed in a contest but was not recruited.

Soon after, John was approached by Malcolm Colcord to join the Weapon X project. Accepting the offer, Washout underwent a process that enhanced his mutant ability to the point where Washout had the ability to transform his body into water, project high pressure jets of water from his arms, shape the water into any form, and even manipulate or siphon off the water within another person's body. However, the process had a severe side effect in that Washout's powers now gradually began to dehydrate him.

The more frequently he used them, the closer he would come to killing himself. His body was slowing cracking apart. Washout found out about these side effects and joined fellow Weapon X agent Brent Jackson in a conspiracy against the Director. They later started to work with Nathan Summers/Soldier X' Underground movement.

Washout helped the Underground infiltrate the Weapon X compound by temporarily shutting down the power. At the same time, he attacked and attempted to kill the Director. He caused the water within the Director's body to boil, but the side effects from his powers caused Washout to die before he could finish off the Director.

Washout's remains were taken by Mister Sinister.

Powers and abilities
He is a hydromorph, able to transform himself into a watery substance that he can release as pressurized sprays, engulf and drown his opponents, harmlessly absorb impacts, or shape all or part of his body into tangible, water-based forms, manipulate other bodies of water, and either explode someone from within or boil & liquidate them using their own body fluids.

Other media

Television
Washout appears in Wolverine and the X-Men episode "Greetings from Genosha".

References

Comics characters introduced in 2002
Marvel Comics characters who are shapeshifters
Marvel Comics mutants
Fictional secret agents and spies
Fictional characters with water abilities
Characters created by Peter Milligan
Fictional African-American people